The Smithsonian Jazz Masterworks Orchestra (SJMO) is the national jazz orchestra of the United States. It is based at the National Museum of American History in Washington, D.C., where it is the orchestra-in-residence. The SJMO was founded in 1990 with the dual mission of  performing and preserving American jazz masterworks and raising public awareness and understanding of the genre.

History
An Act of Congress established the orchestra in 1990 with an appropriation to the Smithsonian Institution of $242,000. In 1991 Gunther Schuller and David Baker became the original artistic and musical directors of the orchestra, which began performing in 1991. Five years later Baker became its sole artistic and musical director. 

The inaugural season, jointly conducted by Schuller and Baker, consisted of six weekends of free concerts for which the conductors collected or commissioned transcriptions of the original arrangements of the works to be presented and provided the orchestra's members with tapes of the original performances. 

Since 1991 the SJMO has performed in nine foreign countries and twenty-six U.S. states, in addition to numerous free concerts in Washington, D.C. Appearances outside their base at the National Museum of American History have included a performance at the White House in 1993 to celebrate the 40th anniversary of the Newport Jazz Festival; the Cultural Olympiad at the 1996 Summer Olympics in Atlanta, Georgia; and a 1999 tour of the United States to present concerts in tribute to the 100th anniversary of Duke Ellington's birth that included a concert performance at the Monterey Jazz Festival featuring Ellington's Suite Thursday, which was commissioned for the festival. Among the orchestra's notable performances under Baker's leadership outside the United States was a concert in Egypt in 2008, when it played at the Cairo Opera House, the Alexandra Opera House, and at the Pyramids.

In 2012, at the age of 80, Baker concluded his tenure as the SJMO's artistic director, and was named maestro emeritus in December 2012. The occasion was marked by a special concert consisting entirely of Baker's compositions. Charlie Young, a jazz saxophonist and educator at Howard University, became artistic director after Baker's retirement.

Members
As of 2015, the orchestra's principal members were:

Artistic and Musical Director
Charlie Young

Executive Producer
Ken Kimery

Reeds
Steve Williams
Bill Mulligan
Scott Silbert
Luis Hernandez
Leigh Pilzer

Trumpets
Liesl Whitaker
Tom Williams
Kenny Rittenhouse

Trombones
Jennifer Krupa
Matt Niess
Bill Holmes
Jeff Cortazzo

Piano
Tony Nalker

Bass
James King
Amy Shook

Drums
Ken Kimery

Discography
The orchestra's recordings include:
Bernstein Reimagined
Tribute to a Generation: A Salute to the Big Bands
Tri-C Jazzfest 2001
Piano Grand! A Smithsonian Celebration
Big Band Treasures Live
Live at MCG

References

External links

"Smithsonian Jazz Masterworks Orchestra: A Tribute to John Levy", Smithsonian's official YouTube channel

Musical groups established in 1990
American jazz ensembles
Smithsonian Institution